Ewil Maxon railway station is a Swiss railway station on the Brünig line, owned by the Zentralbahn, that links Lucerne and Interlaken. The station is in the municipality of Sachseln in the canton of Obwalden. It takes its name from the nearby hamlet of Ewil, together with the precision electric motor manufacturer Maxon Motor, whose plant adjoins the station.

Services 
The following services stop at Ewil Maxon:

References

External links 
 

Railway stations in the canton of Obwalden
Sachseln
Zentralbahn stations